Nitsijärvi is a medium-sized lake in the Lapland of Finland. It is situated only 68 km from the Norwegian border, in the village of Näätämö. It belongs to the Paatsjoki main catchment area.

See also
List of lakes in Finland

References

Lakes of Inari, Finland